Autumn is a 2009 Canadian horror film directed by Steven Rumbelow, written by David Moody and Rumbelow, and starring Dexter Fletcher.  It was based on Moody's self-published novel Autumn.  Fletcher plays a schoolteacher who must survive in a post-apocalyptic world inhabited by evolving zombies. This was the final film of David Carradine before his death.

Premise 
After a viral outbreak kills 99% of the world's population, scattered survivors come together and attempt to deal with the collapse of civilization.  They face a new threat when the dead begin to reanimate.  Initially catatonic, the corpses slowly regain their senses, become increasingly sensitive to outside stimuli, and show signs of aggression.  Eventually, the survivors must fortify themselves against attack and try to find a reason to survive.

Cast

Production 
Author David Moody had offers on two of his novels, Autumn and Hater, at the same time.  Although Hater had Guillermo del Toro attached, Moody reasoned that Autumn, as a small independent film, had a greater chance of being made.  Moody made both deals and participated in the making of Autumn.

Release 
Autumn played at the 2009 Grimm Up North Festival in the UK.

Reception 
The film drew mixed to negative reviews.  Reviewing the film while it was still in post-production, Brutal As Hell wrote that the atmosphere and settings of the film are better than other low budget post-apocalyptic films. Sabrina Bangladesh of Shadowlocked.com wrote that the film is too boring to be "so bad it's good".  Mark L. Miller of Ain't It Cool News called it "a thinking man's zombie flick with some fun performances and decent effects."  Writing in The Zombie Movie Encyclopedia, Volume 2, academic Peter Dendle called the film "a patient meditation" with a "mournful, serious tone" and "rich aesthetic to many of the scenes."

David Moody, the author of the source novel, said, "Ultimately, although it has some redeeming qualities, and the main cast did a great job, I think it was a disappointment to a lot of people. The filmmakers were really stretched by having to work within a microscopic budget, and there are places where that really shows."  The mostly negative reception of Autumn led Dexter Fletcher to direct his own films, which were better received.

References

External links 
 

2009 films
2009 independent films
2000s science fiction horror films
Canadian science fiction horror films
Canadian independent films
Canadian post-apocalyptic films
2000s psychological horror films
Canadian zombie films
English-language Canadian films
Films about viral outbreaks
Canadian psychological horror films
2000s English-language films
2000s Canadian films